Chinthaka Edirimanne (born 26 April 1968) is a Sri Lankan former first-class cricketer who played for Colombo Cricket Club.

References

External links
 

1968 births
Living people
Sri Lankan cricketers
Colombo Cricket Club cricketers
Cricketers from Colombo